Steve Colter (born July 24, 1962) is an American former professional basketball player who played in eight NBA seasons for six different teams. He played for the Trail Blazers, Chicago Bulls, Philadelphia 76ers, Washington Bullets, Sacramento Kings and Cleveland Cavaliers. A 6'3" guard from New Mexico State, he was selected by the Portland Trail Blazers in the second round (33rd overall) of the 1984 NBA draft.

In his NBA career, Colter played in 526 games and scored a total of 3,319 points. His best year as a professional came during the 1985–86 season as a member of the Trail Blazers, appearing in 81 games (51 starts) and averaging 8.7 points per game. From 1991 until 1994 he did not play in the NBA, but returned to play for the Cleveland Cavaliers for one more season before retiring in 1995. He also became an import in the Philippine Basketball Association played with the Shell Rimula X in 1992.

External links
NBA stats @ databasebasketball.com

1962 births
Living people
African-American basketball players
American expatriate basketball people in Croatia
American men's basketball players
Basketball players from Phoenix, Arizona
Chicago Bulls players
Cleveland Cavaliers players
KK Split players
New Mexico State Aggies men's basketball players
Omaha Racers players
Philadelphia 76ers players
Philippine Basketball Association imports
Point guards
Portland Trail Blazers draft picks
Portland Trail Blazers players
Sacramento Kings players
Shell Turbo Chargers players
Washington Bullets players
21st-century African-American people
20th-century African-American sportspeople